Tommy Sandlin (31 March 194427 December 2006) was a Swedish professional ice hockey coach.  He led Sweden to victory at the 1987 World Ice Hockey Championship, and was nicknamed "The Hockey Professor" for his tactical skills.

References

1944 births
2006 deaths
Sweden men's national ice hockey team coaches
Swedish ice hockey coaches
People from Gävle
Sportspeople from Gävleborg County